Bela Juhasz may refer to:
 Béla Juhász, Hungarian long-distance runner
 Bela Juhasz (wrestler),Yugoslav wrestler